Polygaloides paucifolia, synonym Polygala paucifolia, known as gaywings or fringed polygala, is a perennial plant of the family Polygalaceae.

Mature plants are 3 to 6 inches tall. Stems are smooth, slender and green. Leaves are clustered at the top, appearing to be whorled, but they are not. Leaflets are oblong to lanceolate—narrow at the base with a pointed tip. Leaves have an entire margin and are thin.

Flowers are pink and white, blooming in April and May. It grows in rich, moist woods.

The species was first described, as Polygala paucifolia, by Carl Ludwig Willdenow in 1802. In 2011, John Richard Abbott divided up part of the genus Polygala into more sharply defined genera. He placed P. paucifolia in Polygaloides as Polygaloides paucifolia.

References

External links
 Connecticut Botanical Society: Polygala paucifolia

Polygalaceae
Flora of North America